Li Meng may refer to:
 Li Meng (politician), Chinese politician
 Li Meng (gymnast) (born 1990), Chinese synchronised trampolinist
 Li Meng (basketball) (born 1995), Chinese basketball player